The Royal Victoria Hospital (RVH), colloquially known as the "Royal Vic" or "The Vic", is a hospital in Montreal, Quebec, Canada. It forms the biggest base hospital of the McGill University Health Centre (MUHC), which is affiliated with McGill University. The hospital was established in 1893 and was based at Pine Avenue, now known as the Legacy site, until 2015, when major hospital operations were moved to the Glen site (1001 Décarie Boulevard), named for the former Glen railway yards. The future uses of the Legacy site are now under study and it seems likely that the site, which is adjacent to its main campus, will be taken over by McGill University.

History

The Royal Victoria Hospital was established in 1893 in the historic Golden Square Mile through donations by two public-spirited Scottish immigrants, the cousins Donald Smith, 1st Lord Strathcona, and George Stephen, 1st Lord Mount Stephen. In 1887, they announced a joint gift of C$1,000,000 for the construction of a free hospital in Montreal and purchased a site on Mount Royal for a further C$86,000. The site they bought was the old Frothingham estate that covered ten acres of land. During 1897 and 1898, Smith and Stephen gave another C$1,000,000 between them in Great Northern Railroad securities to establish an endowment fund to maintain the hospital. Stephen and Smith attached one caveat to their generous contribution to the City of Montreal: the hospital's land and its buildings must only ever be used for healing.

The founders intended the Royal Vic "to be for the use of the sick and ailing without distinction of race or creed," and when it opened in 1893 it was hailed as the "finest and most perfectly equipped (hospital) on the great American continent". The hospital originally had 150 employees, including 14 medical doctors.

Over the years, the philanthropy and business acumen of many of the residents of the Golden Square Mile - the prominent members of Montreal's English speaking community - brought the hospital global recognition as a major centre of healthcare and learning. Major contributors included James Ross, Richard Angus, Sir Vincent Meredith and Sir Montagu Allan.

In 1920, the hospital became a medical research institute through the McGill University Faculty of Medicine. In 1929, Dr. Wilder Penfield established the Montreal Neurological Institute adjacent to the hospital.  Among the list of medical achievements at the Royal Victoria was the first successful kidney transplant in the Commonwealth in 1958.  It was achieved by a team led by nephrologist John Dossetor and surgeons Joe Luke and Ken MacKinnon. Today, the Royal Victoria Hospital is part of the McGill University Health Centre.

Amid the 2020 coronavirus pandemic, the hospital is currently being used as an isolation unit for homeless people who have been infected with coronavirus disease 2019 (COVID-19), as well as those awaiting test results.

Legacy site

The hospital was previously housed in a building complex at 687 Pine Avenue on the slope of Mount Royal in the borough of Ville-Marie. Hospital operations moved to the new Glen site of the McGill University Health Centre on April 26, 2015, except for the McGill Reproductive Centre and the Dialysis Clinic, which remained at the original site as of 2015. Of its nine pavilions, three date from the original 1893 hospital and were designed by Henry Saxon Snell in the Scottish baronial style. The nearby Allan Memorial Institute continues to house the psychiatry department. The post-2015 future of the 122-year-old Royal Vic building is yet to be determined. McGill University has unveiled an idea to repurpose the hospital for academic purposes, but also add community and green space.

The original hospital was designed by the Scottish architect Henry Saxon Snell, who from the 1860s had made a name for himself in England and Scotland as a leading specialist in the design of  hospitals, particularly in London. Constructed of Montreal limestone, the original Royal Vic is distinguished by its crenelated structures and romantic turrets framing generous sun porches at the corners of its imposing medical and surgical wards. Snell's aesthetic plans for the Royal Vic were inspired by the Scottish baronial style of the Royal Infirmary of Edinburgh. From a medical perspective, his design of the Royal Vic was influenced by the ideas of Florence Nightingale as a Pavilion Hospital, in which the separation and isolation of both patients and diseases were thought to discourage the spread of infection. The original part of the building was completed in 1893.

The hospital was later enlarged by the addition of new wings of the same architectural style. The H pavilion opened in 1905 as the nurses' residence). The 1920s saw the addition of the Women's and Ross Memorial pavilions.  Another expansion was completed in the early 1950s giving the hospital its M and S pavilions; a portion of the original hospital was demolished to accomplish this.  Lastly the C pavilion, housing the emergency room, birthing centre, and a large modern ICU opened in 1993.  A time capsule is located in the wall facing the C pavilion's elevators on the ground floor.

Hersey Pavilion
The Hersey Pavilion, also known as the H Pavilion, was one of the first purpose-built nurses' residences in Canada. It is located on the hospital campus, and was constructed in 1905. It was designed by the well-known Montreal architects Edward & William Sutherland Maxwell. It was designated a National Historic Site of Canada in 1997 in recognition of the important role the building played in the training and professionalism of nurses in Canada.

Pool
The hospital had an outdoor pool and patio located between the Hersey pavilion and Allan Memorial Institute.  As of 2014, the pool is closed until further notice.

Notable surgeons
Sir Thomas Roddick, first Surgeon-in-Chief of the Royal Vic
Edward William Archibald, dubbed Canada's first neurosurgeon; President of the American Surgical Association
Lt.-Colonel John McCrae, Royal Vic physician who wrote In Flanders Fields
Norman Bethune, developed a mobile blood-transfusion service during the Spanish Civil War
Wilder Penfield OM, CC, CMG, FRS, founded the Montreal Neurological Institute; called "the greatest living Canadian" in his day.
Martin Henry Dawson, the first person in history to inject penicillin into a patient, 1940
Arthur Vineberg OC, developed the 'Vineberg Procedure' at the Royal Vic in 1950
Kathryn Stephenson, the first female American plastic surgeon; first female editor of Plastic and Reconstructive Surgery
John Dossetor OC, co–coordinated the first kidney transplant in both Canada and the Commonwealth, 1958
Balfour Mount OC,  considered the father of palliative care in North America.
Jonathan Larmonth Meakins OC, Royal Vic Chief Surgeon; 4th person & 1st Canadian Nuffield Professor of Surgery at Oxford, 2002

Notable nurses
Mabel Clint, war-time nurse who served with the Canadian Expeditionary Force during World War I in France, Belgium, and Greece.

See also
 Montreal Neurological Institute
 Allan Memorial Institute
 Montreal General Hospital

References

External links
Annmarie Adams, Medicine by Design:  The Architect and the Modern Hospital, 1893–1943.  University of Minnesota Press, 2008.
Photograph: Aerial View of the Royal Victoria Hospital circa 1925. McCord Museum
Photograph: Royal Victoria Hospital circa 1918. McCord Museum

Hospitals in Montreal
Côte-des-Neiges–Notre-Dame-de-Grâce
Organizations based in Canada with royal patronage
Hospitals established in 1893
Hospital buildings completed in 1893
Scottish baronial architecture in Canada
Mount Royal
Gothic Revival architecture in Montreal
McGill University buildings